Gezong (Mandarin: 格宗镇) is a town in Danba County, Garzê Tibetan Autonomous Prefecture, Sichuan, China. In 2010, Gezong had a total population of 4,043: 2,048 males and 1,995 females: 867 aged under 14, 2,833 aged between 15 and 65 and 343 aged over 65.

References 

Towns in Sichuan
Populated places in the Garzê Tibetan Autonomous Prefecture